(1121-1206), also known as , was a Japanese Buddhist monk. From 1181 he devoted twenty-five years of his life to the endowment and rebuilding of Tōdai-ji after its destruction in war.

Sources

A contemporary record known as the Benevolent Deeds of Namu-Amidabutsu provides the fullest evidence for Chōgen's life and career. By the time of the illustrated Tōdaiji Daibutsu engi of the 1530s, which includes a scene of Chōgen at sea conveying logs for the great rebuilding, invocation of his memory could include a "mixture of fact and fable".

Biography
Born most likely in Kyoto in 1121, Chōgen was initiated into religious life at the Shingon centre of Daigo-ji at age thirteen. Later in his teens he undertook ascetic practices in Shikoku and at Mount Ōmine, followed in his early twenties by time at Koyasan. After assorted pious deeds, including chanting the nembutsu a million times and the donation of statues and sutras to a number of temples, involvement in public works in the manner of Gyōki and Kūya, and possible trips to China, in 1181 Chōgen was appointed to raise funds for the reconstruction of Tōdai-ji. Over the next twenty-five years he oversaw repairs to the Giant Buddha, the hall in which it was housed, the south gate, and numerous other buildings in the temple complex, as well as being involved in the commissioning of numerous replacement images. He also continued his civic works, repairing bridges, driving robbers from the mountains, and easing the distress of man and beast. He finally died in the Pure Land hall at Tōdai-ji at the age of eighty-five in 1206.

See also
 Rōben
 List of National Treasures of Japan (sculptures)
 List of Cultural Properties of Tōdai-ji
 Kanjin

References

Japanese Buddhist clergy
People of Heian-period Japan
People of Kamakura-period Japan
1121 births
1206 deaths
Heian period Buddhist clergy
Kamakura period Buddhist clergy